Vic Chou (born 9 June 1981) is a Taiwanese actor and singer. He is a member of the Taiwanese boy band F4.

Career

F4
Chou rose to fame for his role as Hua Ze Lei in the highly popular Taiwan television series Meteor Garden. At the conclusion of the series, Chou along with the other cast members of Meteor Garden; Jerry Yan, Vanness Wu and Ken Chu continued to perform together and released three studio albums as the quartet boy band F4.

Music career
Chou was the first F4 member to release his own album Make a Wish in January 2002. This was followed by Remember, I Love You which was released in January 2004.

His third album, I'm Not F4 was released in October 2007 and topped Taiwan's major charts for 3 weeks.

Acting career
Aside from Meteor Garden, Chou has appeared in Taiwanese series such as Poor Prince and Love Storm, considered to be very "typical" idol dramas. However, with the 2004 television series Mars, Zhou took on a more complex role as a set of twins who have mental illnesses. Zhou considers a turning point in his career. In many interviews, Zhou has pinpointed this as the moment where his interest in acting was truly piqued. Since then, he has taken on increasingly multi-facted roles, such as an ambitious but lonely businessman in Silence, a cranky perfectionist in Sweet Relationship, and an awkward but passionate novelist in Wish to See You Again.

In 2008, Chou embarked on his first film, Linger alongside Li Bingbing.

In 2009, he took a departure from Taiwanese idol dramas and starred in the police drama Black & White. Zhou takes on the challenging role of an emotionally complex policeman with a past that is thrown into a dangerous web of corruption. Chou was nominated for Best Actor at the 44th Golden Bell Awards for his performance in Black & White.

In 2010, Chou won "Most Popular Taiwanese Actor" at the Seoul International Drama Awards. The same year, he starred in the romance film Love You 10,000 Years. The film was the 5th best-selling Chinese film in Taiwan for 2010, and won "Most Popular with the Audience" at the 6th Osaka Asian Film Festival.

In 2012, Chou starred alongside Ella Chen in the romance comedy film New Perfect Two.

In 2013, Chou won the Golden Bell Award for Best Actor for his performance in Home. He went on to star in sequel films Don't Go Breaking My Heart 2, Go Lala Go 2, and Storm (sequel of Z Storm); as well as suspense film Detective Gui and comedy film Two Wrongs Make A Right.

Chou returned to the small screen after five years in 2018, starring in two period dramas Beauties in the Closet and The Flame's Daughter. He is set to star in the historical drama Poetry of the Song Dynasty alongside Liu Tao, portraying Zhao Heng.

Filmography

Film

Television series

Discography

Studio albums

Singles

Publications
He also released a photographic album in October 2002, titled Travel Dream (流浪夢) which contains his pictures shot during one of his trips to Hokkaidō, Japan.

His second photobook titled 4Faces: Taipei & Tokyo was released in October 2006. There are 4 themes: Natural Face, Cool Face, Stylish Face and Fashionable Face. The first 2 themes were shot in Taipei while the last 2 themes were shot in Tokyo.

Awards and nominations

References

External links

 

Atayal people
Living people
F4 (band) members
21st-century Taiwanese male actors
21st-century Taiwanese  male singers
Taiwanese male film actors
Taiwanese male television actors
People from Yilan County, Taiwan
Taiwanese idols
1981 births